Blair Allen Rasmussen (born November 13, 1962) is a retired American professional basketball player who was selected by the Denver Nuggets in the first round (15th overall) of the 1985 NBA Draft. A 7'0" center from the University of Oregon, Rasmussen played for eight seasons in the NBA, from 1985 to 1993. He played for the Nuggets from 1985 to 1991 and for the Atlanta Hawks from 1991 to 1993. The best year of Rasmussen's professional career came during the 1990–91 season as a member of the Nuggets, when he appeared in 70 games (69 starts),  and averaged 12.5 points per game and 1.9 blocks per game.

External links
 

1962 births
Living people
American men's basketball players
Atlanta Hawks players
Basketball players from Washington (state)
Centers (basketball)
Denver Nuggets draft picks
Denver Nuggets players
Oregon Ducks men's basketball players
Parade High School All-Americans (boys' basketball)
People from Auburn, Washington
Sportspeople from King County, Washington